Jason Demers (born June 9, 1988) is a Canadian professional ice hockey defenceman who is currently playing for the Bakersfield Condors in the American Hockey League (AHL) while under contract with the Edmonton Oilers of the National Hockey League (NHL). He was drafted by the San Jose Sharks in the seventh round, 186th overall, at the 2008 NHL Entry Draft.

Playing career

Amateur
As a youth, Demers played in the 2001 and 2002 Quebec International Pee-Wee Hockey Tournaments with a minor ice hockey team from West Island, Montreal.

Demers played major junior ice hockey in the Quebec Major Junior Hockey League (QMJHL), splitting his time between the Moncton Wildcats and the Victoriaville Tigres. In the 2007–08 season for the Tigres, Demers led the QMJHL in defenceman scoring with 64 points in 67 games. He went undrafted by the NHL until he completed his major junior career in 2008, whereupon he was selected by the San Jose Sharks in the seventh round of the 2008 NHL Entry Draft, 186th overall.

Professional

San Jose Sharks
Demers began his professional career with San Jose's American Hockey League (AHL) affiliate, the Worcester Sharks, scoring 33 points in 78 games in the 2008–09 season. In the team's post-season run, he also played in 12 Calder Cup playoff games for Worcester.

Demers made his NHL debut on October 1, 2009, against the Colorado Avalanche after surviving the final cut in the San Jose Sharks training camp for the 2009–10 season. He scored his first career NHL point in the second game of the season on October 3 against the Anaheim Ducks, earning the primary assist on Benn Ferriero goal, the first of his career. Demers himself scored his first career NHL goal on November 15 against Cristobal Huet of the Chicago Blackhawks.

Demers' first multi-goal game came later in the season, on January 30, 2010, where he scored two power play goals against Josh Harding of the Minnesota Wild. Demers scored his first career Stanley Cup playoff goal against the Chicago Blackhawks on May 16 in the Western Conference Finals, a series the Sharks lost in a four-game sweep.

On March 28, 2013, in a 2–0 victory against the Detroit Red Wings, Demers suffered a head injury after suffering a hit from Cory Emmerton; he was replaced on defence by forward Brent Burns for the Sharks' next game, which was against the Phoenix Coyotes on March 30.

Dallas Stars

On November 21, 2014, just over one month into the 2014–15 season, Demers was traded to the Dallas Stars, along with a third-round pick, in exchange for defenceman Brenden Dillon.

Florida Panthers
On July 2, 2016, Demers left the Stars organization as a free agent and signed a five-year deal worth $22.5 million with the Florida Panthers. In his lone season with the club, Demers recorded 9 goals and 28 points in 81 games.

Arizona Coyotes
On September 17, 2017, Demers was traded to the Arizona Coyotes in exchange for former teammate, Jamie McGinn.

Ak Bars Kazan
Following his fourth season within the Coyotes organization and having played 12 years in the NHL, Demers entered the  season as an unsigned free agent. On December 20, 2021, Demers opted to continue his career abroad, agreeing to a one-year contract for the remainder of the season with Russian club Ak Bars Kazan of the KHL.

Edmonton Oilers
As a free agent at the conclusion of his contract with Ak Bars, Demers went un-signed over the summer. With aspirations to resume his career in the NHL, Demers accepted an invitation to join the Edmonton Oilers training camp and pre-season in preparation for the  season. Remaining with the Oilers through the entire pre-season, Demers was released from his tryout from the Oilers, however joined AHL affiliate, the Bakersfield Condors, on a professional tryout on October 11, 2022. Registering 9 assists through 23 games with the Condors, Demers having established himself within the team, secured a one-year, two-way contract with the Edmonton Oilers on December 18, 2022.

International play

Demers first played for Team Canada during the NHL Lockout at the 2013 Spengler Cup. Demers was added to Team Canada for his first IIHF-sanctioned tournament at the 2017 World Championships in Germany/France. In 10 games, Demers went scoreless as Canada suffered a 2-1 shootout defeat in the final against Sweden on May 21, 2017, to finish with the Silver Medal.

In January 2022, Demers was selected to play for Team Canada at the 2022 Winter Olympics.

Personal life
Demers was born in Dorval, Quebec, the son of Guylaine and Darrell Demers. In the 2010s, he discovered that he has Jewish ancestry on his father's side; upon his realization, Demers stated, "[Being Jewish] is on my father’s side of the family tree. It all came as a little bit of a surprise, but we welcomed it... Obviously, having that new-found heritage makes me curious."
Demers has been in a relationship with Broadway actress Jillian Mueller since 2015.

Career statistics

Regular season and playoffs

International

See also
List of select Jewish ice hockey players

References

External links

Hockey's Future prospect profile

1988 births
21st-century Canadian Jews
Ak Bars Kazan players
Anglophone Quebec people
Arizona Coyotes players
Bakersfield Condors players
Canadian expatriate ice hockey players in Finland
Canadian expatriate sportspeople in the United States
Canadian ice hockey defencemen
Canadian people of Jewish descent
Dallas Stars players
Florida Panthers players
French Quebecers
Ice hockey players at the 2022 Winter Olympics
Jewish Canadian sportspeople
Jewish ice hockey players
Living people
Moncton Wildcats players
Olympic ice hockey players of Canada
Oulun Kärpät players
People from Dorval
San Jose Sharks draft picks
San Jose Sharks players
Ice hockey people from Montreal
Tucson Roadrunners players
Victoriaville Tigres players
Worcester Sharks players